The 1932 Cardiganshire by-election was a parliamentary by-election held on 22 September 1932 for the British House of Commons constituency of Cardiganshire.

Previous Member of Parliament
The seat had become vacant when the constituency's Liberal Member of Parliament (MP), Rhys Hopkin Morris (5 September 1888 – 22 November 1956) resigned after being appointed a Metropolitan Police Magistrate (a full-time paid magistrate, sitting as a judicial officer at courts in the London Metropolitan Police area).

Rhys Hopkin Morris was born in Maesteg, Glamorgan. He qualified as a barrister in 1919, after serving as an Army officer during the First World War.

Hopkin Morris was an uncompromising adherent of traditional Liberalism. He was unsympathetic to David Lloyd George. As Hopkin Morris said in 1924, "I am not a follower of Mr Lloyd George and I have no intention of being one". He voted against Lloyd George being Liberal leader in 1926 and was the only Liberal MP to vote against Lloyd George's re-election as leader in 1929.

Hopkin Morris had first contested Cardiganshire, as the official candidate of the Liberal Party, in the 1922 general election. He lost to Lloyd George's private secretary Ernest Evans, standing for the National Liberal Party. In the 1923 general election, after the two Liberal factions had re-united, Evans was the Liberal nominee. Rhys Hopkin Morris stood again, as an Independent Liberal, and won the seat. Thereafter he took the Liberal whip and was MP for the seat until resigning in August 1932.

After the by-election, Hopkin Morris served as a Magistrate from 1932 until 1936. He was then appointed to the newly created post of British Broadcasting Corporation regional director for Wales. In that post he argued for Welsh language broadcasting, particularly during the Second World War. After this involvement in broadcasting, between 1936 and 1945, Hopkin Morris returned to politics. He was elected Liberal MP for Carmarthen in the 1945 general election and retained that seat until his death in 1956.

Rhys Hopkin Morris was Deputy Chairman of Ways and Means (a deputy Speaker of the House of Commons) between November 1951 and November 1956. He was knighted in 1954.

Candidates
Three candidates were nominated for the by-election. The list below is set out in descending order of the number of votes received at the by-election.

At the time of the by-election, both the Conservative and Liberal parties were participating in the coalition National government. Despite this coalition both parties nominated a candidate. The Liberal ministers resigned from the National government on 28 September 1932, just six days after the by-election.

1. Owen Evans (5 February 1876 – 11 June 1945) was the Liberal candidate.

Evans was a barrister and company director. After winning the by-election he retained the seat until his death, shortly before the dissolution of Parliament in 1945. He was awarded a knighthood, but died before he was actually knighted.

2. The Conservative candidate was E.C.L. Fitzwilliam, who had previously contested the seat in the 1929 general election.

3. Representing the Labour Party was the Reverend D.M. Jones. He was only the second Labour candidate to contest the constituency.

Previous result

Results

See also
 Cardiganshire constituency
 List of United Kingdom by-elections (1931–1950)
 United Kingdom by-election records

References

 British Parliamentary Election Results 1918-1949, compiled and edited by F.W.S. Craig (Macmillan Press 1977)
 Dictionary of Liberal Biography, edited by Duncan Brack et al. (Politico's Publishing 1998)
 Who's Who of British Members of Parliament, Volume III 1919-1945, edited by M. Stenton and S. Lees (Harvester Press 1979)
 Who's Who of British Members of Parliament, Volume IV 1945-1979, edited by M. Stenton and S. Lees (Harvester Press 1981)

Further reading
 
 
 A Vision Of Britain Through Time (Constituency elector numbers)

1932 elections in the United Kingdom
1932 in Wales
1930s elections in Wales
By-elections to the Parliament of the United Kingdom in Welsh constituencies
History of Ceredigion
20th century in Ceredigion